Maricopa station is an Amtrak train station in Maricopa, Arizona, United States, serving Phoenix and central Arizona. The station accommodates travelers who use the combined Sunset Limited and Texas Eagle, which operates three times per week in each direction between Los Angeles and Chicago or New Orleans. Amtrak Thruway service (operated by Stagecoach Express) is available between Maricopa station, Tempe station and Phoenix Sky Harbor International Airport.

History 
Maricopa station opened in 1996 after Amtrak was forced to withdraw from Phoenix Union Station due to deteriorated track conditions on the secondary Union Pacific Railroad line which diverged from the mainline to serve Phoenix.

In 1999, the Chicago, Burlington and Quincy Railroad dome car, "The Silver Horizon" that was previously used on the California Zephyr was moved to the site to be used as the station office.

The old railcar would eventually prove unsuitable, and Amtrak moved the modular buildings that were previously used during the Tucson station remodeling to Maricopa. The historic dome car remained on the station site on static display.

On May 1, 2017, Amtrak started a new Amtrak Thruway shuttle service (operated by Stagecoach Express) connecting Maricopa station with Tempe station and Phoenix Sky Harbor International Airport.

This arrangement forces train crews to make as many as four separate stops in order to load and unload passengers from various sections of the train. Because the platform is located was close to Arizona State Route 347, traffic on the highway could be blocked for more than 15 minutes.

The city of Maricopa and Union Pacific Railroad studied moving the station west onto a siding on city-owned property, but the cost came out to $4.2 million, which the city was unwilling to pay. The project was replaced with a plan to build a new overpass that would carry SR 347 over the railroad tracks. The $55 million project was funded with grants received from the federal government, as well as in part by the City of Maricopa, the Arizona Department of Transportation, and the Union Pacific Railroad.

As part of the project, the dome car was moved from the station to a location  down the Maricopa-Casa Grande Highway on January 10, 2019. 

Amtrak has suggested direct rail service could return to Phoenix by 2035.

References

External links 

 Maricopa Amtrak Station (USA Rail Guide – Train Web)

Buildings and structures in Pinal County, Arizona
Amtrak stations in Arizona
Transportation in Pinal County, Arizona
Maricopa, Arizona
Railway stations in the United States opened in 1996